iMac is a family of all-in-one Mac desktop computers designed and built by Apple Inc. It has been the primary part of Apple's consumer desktop offerings since its debut in August 1998, and has evolved through seven distinct forms.

In its original form, the iMac G3 had a gumdrop or egg-shaped look, with a CRT monitor, mainly enclosed by a colored, translucent plastic case, which was refreshed early on with a sleeker design notable for its slot-loaded optical drive. The second major revision, the iMac G4, moved the design to a hemispherical base containing all the main components and an LCD monitor on a freely moving arm attached to it. The third and fourth major revisions, the iMac G5 and the Intel iMac respectively, placed all the components immediately behind the display, creating a slim unified design that tilts only up and down on a simple metal base.

The fifth major revision (mid-2007) shared the same form as the previous model, but was thinner and used anodized aluminum and a glass panel over the entire front. The seventh major revision (late 2012) uses a different display unit, omits the SuperDrive, and uses different production techniques from the older unibody versions. This allows it to be thinner at the edge than older models, with an edge thickness of 5.9  mm (but the same maximum depth). It also includes a dual microphone setup and includes solid-state drive (SSD) or hard disk storage, or an Apple Fusion Drive, a hybrid of solid-state and hard disk drives. This version of the iMac was announced in October 2012, with the  version released in November and the  version in December; these were refreshed in September 2013, with new Haswell processors, faster graphics, faster and larger SSD options and 802.11ac Wi-Fi cards.

In October 2014, a major revision of the  iMac was announced, whose main feature is a "Retina 5K" display at a resolution of 5120 × 2880 pixels. The new model also includes a new processor, graphics chip, and IO, along with several new storage options. A major revision of the  iMac was announced in October 2015. Its main feature is a "Retina 4K" display at a resolution of 4096 × 2304 pixels. It has the same new processor, graphics chip, and I/O as the 27-inch iMac, along with several new storage options.

On June 5, 2017, Apple announced a workstation-class version called the iMac Pro, which features Intel Xeon processors and standard SSD storage. It shares the design and screen of the 5K iMac but is colored in Space Gray rather than silver. Apple began shipping the iMac Pro in December 2017. The iMac Pro was discontinued in 2021.

On April 20, 2021, Apple announced a 24" iMac (actual diagonal screen size is 23.5 in.) with an Apple M1 processor, its first as part of its transition to Apple silicon. It comes in 7 colors (Silver, Blue, Green, Orange, Yellow, Purple, and Pink) with a 4.5K Retina display. On the base configuration, the M1 iMacs come with two Thunderbolt 3/USB 4 ports, and two USB Type-C 3.1 Gen 2 ports on the higher configurations.

History 
The announcement of the iMac in 1998 was a source of controversy and anticipation among commentators, Mac fans, and detractors. Opinions were divided over Apple's drastic changes to the Macintosh hardware. At the time, Apple had suffered a series of setbacks as consumers increasingly opted for Wintel (Windows PCs with Intel CPUs) machines instead of Apple's Performa models. Many in the industry thought that "beleaguered" Apple would soon be forced to start selling computers with a custom interface built on top of one or more potential operating system bases, such as Taligent, Solaris, or Windows 98.

The designer behind iMac's case was Jonathan Ive.

Ken Segall was an employee at an L.A. ad agency handling Apple's account who came up with the name "iMac" and pitched it to Steve Jobs. After Jobs' death, Segall claimed Jobs preferred "MacMan" for the name of the computer, but after Segall pitched "iMac" to him twice, the name was accepted. Segall says that the "i" stands for "Internet", but also represents the product as a personal and revolutionary device ('i' for "individuality" and "innovation").  Apple later adopted the 'i' prefix across its consumer hardware and software lines, such as iPod, iBook (later MacBook), iPhone, iPad and various pieces of software such as the iLife, iCloud suite and iWork and the company's media player/store, iTunes.

Attention was given to the out-of-box experience: the user needed to go through only two steps to set up and connect to the Internet. "There's no step 3!" was the catch-phrase in a popular iMac commercial narrated by actor Jeff Goldblum. Another commercial, dubbed "Simplicity Shootout", pitted seven-year-old Johann Thomas and his border collie Brodie, with an iMac, against Adam Taggart, a Stanford University MBA student, with an HP Pavilion 8250, in a race to set up their computers. Johann and Brodie finished in 8 minutes and 15 seconds, whereas Adam was still working on it by the end of the commercial.

Updates 

By 2005, it had become more and more apparent that IBM's development for the desktop implementation of PowerPC was grinding to a halt. Apple announced at the Worldwide Developers Conference that it would be switching the Macintosh to the x86 architecture and Intel's line of Core processors. The first Intel-equipped Macs were unveiled on January 10, 2006: the Intel iMac and the introductory MacBook Pro. Within nine months, Apple had smoothly transitioned the entire Macintosh line to Intel. One of the highly touted side benefits of this switch was the ability to run Windows on Mac hardware. 

On July 27, 2010, Apple updated its line of iMacs to feature the new Intel Core "i-series" processors across the line. The 21.5" models now feature the Core i3 processor, but these are upgradable to the Core i5. The high-end 27" features a Quad-Core i5 processor, which is upgradable to a Quad-Core i7. On this date, Apple also announced its new "Apple Magic Trackpad" peripheral, a trackpad similar to that of the MacBook Pro for use with iMac or any other Apple computer. Apple also introduced a AA NiMH battery charger intended to simplify the use of batteries in these peripherals. Apple offers an option to use a solid-state drive instead of a large mechanical drive.

On May 3, 2011, Apple updated its iMac line with the introduction of Intel Thunderbolt technology and Intel Core i5 and i7 Sandy Bridge processors as well as a 1 mega pixel high definition FaceTime camera, features which were first introduced in the MacBook Pro line in February 2011.

On October 23, 2012, a new iMac was announced (for a November/December release) with a substantially thinner edge, new Apple Fusion Drive, faster processors (Intel Core i5 and i7 Ivy Bridge) and graphics along with updates to the ports, but with the same overall depth (stand depth: 8 inches (20.3  cm)). To reduce the edge, the SuperDrive was removed on these iMacs.

On October 16, 2014, a new version of the 27-inch (69  cm) iMac was announced, whose main feature is a "Retina 5K" display at a resolution of 5120 × 2880 pixels. The new model also includes a new processor, graphics chip, and I/O, along with several new storage options. This computer was designed with professional photographers and video editors in mind, with the 5K resolution allowing 4K video to be played at its native resolution in Final Cut Pro, with room for toolbars on the side.

On June 6, 2017, Apple’s 21.5-inch iMac, which has a "Retina 4K" display at a resolution of 4096 × 2304 pixels, and the latest Intel 7th generation i5 processor, was announced. The iMac has Turbo Boost up to 3.6 GHz supported, and a 1 TB hard drive. Apple’s iMac with 4K display has Intel Core i5 quad-core processor with 3 GHz or 3.4 GHz clock speed. The RAM on board is 8 GB, and it will support a Turbo boost of up to 3.8 GHz. This iMac has options of 1 TB hard drive or 1 TB Fusion Drive. This 21.5-inch iMac also has the option of Radeon Pro 555 with 2 GB of video RAM for graphics or a Radeon Pro 560 with 4 GB of video RAM. Apple’s 27-inch iMac with the 5K display comes with the quad-core Intel Core i5 processor, which is clocked at 3.4 GHz, 3.5 GHz, or 3.8 GHz. This iMac supports a Turbo boost of up to 4.2Ghz and comes with 8 GB RAM option.

In March 2019, Apple updated the iMac to feature 9th-generation Intel Core i9 processors and Radeon Vega graphics. Unlike most other Apple releases, Apple opted not to announce the iMac at an event; instead, they updated the specs and released a press statement. For the first time, the iMac can support 6-core or 8-core Intel processors. Apple claims the 21.5-inch model is up to 60% faster than the previous model, and the 27-inch is up to 2.4 times faster. The exterior of the machine remained the same as the previous model.

On August 4, 2020, Apple refreshed the iMac models. The smaller 21.5-inch model was updated with SSDs standard. The 27-inch model received 10th generation Intel chips, a T2 Security chip, a 1080p camera, studio-quality microphone, an option for nano-textured glass, as well as SSDs standard. The 27-inch model now has SSDs soldered to the motherboard, which means the storage is no longer replaceable, and in order to replace a hard drive the entire motherboard must be replaced and any data on the drive will be wiped.

On April 20, 2021, Apple announced redesigned iMacs with a 24-inch display, new colors (7), updated cameras, and the inclusion of the Apple M1 chip.

Influence 

The original iMac was the first legacy-free PC. It was the first Macintosh computer to have a USB port but no floppy disk drive. Subsequently, all Macs have included USB. Via the USB port, hardware makers could make products compatible with both x86 PCs and Macs. Previously, Macintosh users had to seek out certain hardware, such as keyboards and mice specifically tailored for the "old world" Mac's unique ADB interface and printers and modems with MiniDIN-8 serial ports. Only a limited number of models from certain manufacturers were made with these interfaces and often came at a premium price. USB, being cross-platform, has allowed Macintosh users to select from a large selection of devices marketed for the Wintel PC platform, such as hubs, scanners, storage devices, USB flash drives, and mice. After the iMac, Apple continued to remove older peripheral interfaces and floppy drives from the rest of its product line.

Borrowing from the 1997 Twentieth Anniversary Macintosh, the various LCD-based iMac designs continued the all-in-one concept first envisioned in Apple's original Macintosh computer. The successful iMac allowed Apple to continue targeting the Power Macintosh line at the high-end of the market. This foreshadowed a similar strategy in the notebook market when the iMac-like iBook was released in 1999. Since then, the company has continued this strategy of differentiating the consumer versus professional product lines. Apple's focus on design has allowed each of its subsequent products to create a distinctive identity. Apple avoided using the beige colors that were then common in the PC industry. The company would later drift from the multicolored designs of the late 1990s and early 2000s. The latter part of the decade saw Apple using anodized aluminum; glass; and white, black, and clear polycarbonate plastics among their build materials. Today many PCs are more design-conscious than before the iMac's introduction, with multi-shaded design schemes being common, and some desktops and laptops available in colorful, decorative patterns.

Apple's use of translucent, candy-colored plastics inspired similar industrial designs in other consumer products. Apple's later introduction of the iPod, iBook G3 (Dual USB), and iMac G4 (all featuring snowy-white plastic), inspired similar designs in other companies' consumer electronics products. The color rollout also featured two distinctive ads: one called 'Life Savers' featured the Rolling Stones song, "She's a Rainbow" and an advertisement for the white version had the introduction of Cream's "White Room" as its backing track.

Reception 

iMac has received considerable critical acclaim, including praise from technology columnist Walt Mossberg as the "Gold Standard of desktop computing"; Forbes magazine described the original candy-colored line of iMac computers as being an "industry-altering success". The first 24" Core 2 Duo iMac received CNET's "Must-have desktop" in their 2006 Top 10 Holiday Gift Picks.

Apple faced a class-action lawsuit filed in 2008 for allegedly deceiving the public by promising millions of colors from the LCD screens of all Mac models while its 20-inch model only held 262,144 colors. This issue arose due to the use of 6-bit per pixel Twisted nematic LCD screens. The case was dismissed on January 21, 2009.

While not a criticism of iMac per se, the integrated design has some inherent tradeoffs that have garnered criticism. In The Mythical Midrange Mac Minitower, Dan Frakes of Macworld suggests that with the iMac occupying the midrange of Apple's product line, Apple has little to offer consumers who want some ability to expand or upgrade their computers, but do not need (or cannot afford) the Mac Pro. For example, iMac's integration of monitor and computer, while convenient, commits the owner to replace both at the same time. For a time before the Mac mini's introduction, there were rumors of a "headless iMac" but the G4 Mac mini as introduced had lower performance compared to the iMac, which at the time featured a G5 processor.  Some third party suppliers such as Other World Computing provide upgrade kits that include specialized tools for working on iMacs.

Similarly, though the graphics chipset in some Intel models is on a removable MXM, neither Apple nor third parties have offered retail iMac GPU upgrades, with the exception of those for the original iMac G3's "mezzanine" PCI slot. Models after iMac G5 (excluding the August 7, 2007 iMac update) made it difficult for the end-user to replace the hard disk or optical drive, and Apple's warranty explicitly forbids upgrading the socketed CPU. While conceding the possibility of a mini-tower cannibalizing sales from the Mac Pro, Frakes argues there is enough frustration with iMac's limitations to make such a proposition worthwhile. This disparity has become more pronounced after the G4 era since the bottom-end Power Mac G5 (with one brief exception) and Mac Pro models have all been priced in the US$1999–2499$ range, while base model Power Macs G4s and earlier were US$1299–1799. The current generation iMac has Intel 5th generation i5 and i7 processors, ranging from quad-core 2.7 GHz i5 to a quad-core 3.4 GHz i7 processor, however it is possible to upgrade the 2010 edition of the iMac quite easily.

Supported operating systems

Supported Apple operating system releases 

Includes 21.5" non-Retina models released in the same date (Late 2015 and Mid 2017)

Supported Windows versions

Timeline of iMac models

References

External links 

 – official site
Apple – Support – Specifications
Apple – Support – How to identify your iMac
Apple Developer Connection – Comprehensive technical details (Latest developer notes)

 
Macintosh all-in-ones
Computer-related introductions in 1998